College Girl is a 1974 Indian Malayalam film, directed by Hariharan and produced by Dr. Balakrishnan. The film stars Prem Nazir, Vidhubala, KP Ummer, Bahadoor, Sudheer, Adoor Bhasi and Balakrishnan in the lead roles. The film has musical score by A. T. Ummer.

Cast

Prem Nazir as Rajan
Vidhubala as Radha
K. P. Ummer as Kunjahammadali Hajiyar
Bahadoor as Damu
Adoor Bhasi as Sukumaran
Balakrishnan
Jose Prakash as Nanu
Manavalan Joseph
Pattom Sadan as Hyder
Sudheer as College Student
Sadhana as Leela
Prema as Vichaminia
Sankaradi as Parakulam Raman Nair
Cochin Haneefa as College Student
Ramdas
T. S. Muthaiah as Leela's Father
Paul Vengola as Govindan
Khadeeja as College Principal
Meena as Meenakshi
Paravoor Bharathan as Kittunni Ammavan
Philomina as Professor / Principal Parukkuttyamma
Karunan
Saraswathi
Unni
Kumaran Nair
Sebastian
Premachandran
Anjana Raja
Balan Kovil
Devnath
Geetha (Old)
Kanjangad Balakrishnan
Muraleedharan
P. C. Thomas
Prajatha
Pushpa
Rajamma
T. S. Radhamani
Vimala Junior

Soundtrack
The music was composed by A. T. Ummer and the lyrics were written by Dr. Balakrishnan.

References

External links
 

1974 films
1970s Malayalam-language films
Films directed by Hariharan